Donald MacInnes, born Donald McInnes, (26 May 1824 – 1 December 1900) was a Canadian businessman and politician.

Born in Oban, Scotland, the son of Duncan McInnes and Johanna Stuart, McInnes’s family emigrated to Upper Canada in 1840 and settled in Ontario. He was married on April 30, 1863 to Mary Amelia Robinson, daughter of Sir John Robinson, 1st Baronet, of Toronto, they had five sons and a daughter (including Duncan Sayre MacInnes).

MacInnes was for several years one of the leading merchants in Canada. He was President of the Bank of Hamilton and a Director of the Canada Life Assurance Co. He was Chairman of the Royal Commission appointed June 16, 1880 to inquire into the organization of the Civil Service of Canada. He was appointed to the Senate on the advice of John Alexander Macdonald representing the senatorial division of Burlington, Ontario on December 24, 1881. A Liberal-Conservative, he served for almost 19 years until his death in 1900.

External links
 
 

1824 births
1900 deaths
Canadian senators from Ontario
Conservative Party of Canada (1867–1942) senators
Scottish emigrants to pre-Confederation Ontario
People from Oban
Immigrants to Upper Canada